Sunday Best or Sunday's Best may refer to:

Sunday Best
Sunday best, clothes reserved for church attendance, see Christian clothing
 Sunday Best (company), British music company
 Sunday Best (American TV series), American Gospel singing competition series on BET
 Sunday Best (Canadian TV series), a documentary television series
 "Sunday Best" (Washington song), 2010
 "Sunday Best" (Surfaces song), 2019

Sunday's Best
Sunday's Best, American emo band
Sunday's Best (TV program), a Filipino TV special on ABS-CBN channel See list
"Sunday's Best", a song by Elvis Costello and the Attractions

See also
Sundy Best, American country music duo